Musongati Football Club, commonly known as Musongati FC or simply Musongati, is an Burundian professional football club based in Gitega, the political capital of Burundi. The club competes in Ligue A, the top level of Burundi's football league system, and plays its home matches at 7,000 capacity Stade Ingoma. Musongati's colours are green and yellow and represent the rich Burundi vegetation.

History 
The club was founded in 1976 in the city of Gitega. Musongati promoted to top-flight of the Burundian football at the end of 2015–16 season winning the Group B of the Burundi Second Division. 

Musongati achieved a fifth-place finish in the 2016–17 season, the 7th place at the end of the 2017–18 season and reached the quarter-finals of Coupe du Président de la République in 2018, losing 0–2 against BS Dynamik.

The yellow-greens finished as runners-up in the 2018–19 season, as well in the 2019–20 season and won their first major trophy in 2020, the Coupe du Président de la République, beating in the final Rukinzo 1–1 (5–4) at penalty shoot-out.

Musongati consequently made its debut in the CAF Confederation Cup the following season, losing in the preliminary round to Zambian club Green Eagles 2–2 at Stade Intwari in Bujumbura and 1–2 at Nkoloma Stadium in Lusaka.

Over the following two seasons, the yellow-greens returned to mid-table, ending the 2020–21 season in fifth position and ninth in the 2021–22 season. Also, managed to qualify to the semi-finals in 2021 and in the quarter-finals in 2022 of Coupe du President de la Republique, losing each time to city rivals, Flambeau du Centre.

Honours 
Burundi Ligue A 
 Runners-up (2): 2018–19, 2019–20Burundi Ligue BWinners (1): 2015–16Coupe du Président de la RépubliqueWinners (1)''': 2020

Performance in CAF competitions

Squad

Management and staff

References

External links 
 

Football clubs in Burundi
Association football clubs established in 1982
Gitega